The Norman Academy (Italian: Accademia Normanna) is an organization established for the promotion of the Arts and Letters, Humanities and Human rights defence throughout the world, incorporated (but not accredited) in the State of Florida, United States. It operates and maintain presence in Rome, Italy and Banjul, the Gambia.

In 1999, the National Prize for Poetry whose ceremony, attended by eminent personalities, was formed. This event takes place yearly in June in Rome.

Beside the Academician of Honour and Academician of Merit awards, the Academic Senate also awards each year The Capitoline Gold, its highest distinction prize, to figures from around the world for social solidarity, cultural development, political accomplishments, economic contribution, research and science in general.

Attached to the academy is the unaccredited university "Studiorum Universitas Ruggero II", which issues unaccredited honorary degrees based on life experience.

References

External links
 Studiorum Universitas Ruggero II, branch of Norman Academy.

Unaccredited institutions of higher learning in the United States